Kingsbury-Doak Farmhouse, also known as the Steele Farmhouse, is a historic home located in Eagle Creek Township, Lake County, Indiana.  The house was built in two sections.  The older section was built in the 1860s, and is a simple -story, frame structure that now forms the rear wing.  The two-story, Italianate style frame section was added in the 1880s.  It has a cross-gable roof with overhanging eaves and sits on a fieldstone foundation. It features windows with unique decorative pedimented hoods.

It was listed in the National Register of Historic Places in 2005.

References

Houses on the National Register of Historic Places in Indiana
Italianate architecture in Indiana
Houses completed in 1865
Buildings and structures in Lake County, Indiana
National Register of Historic Places in Lake County, Indiana